The germ-line theory was a proposed explanation for immunoglobulin diversity that proposed that each antibody was encoded in a separate germline gene. 

This does not occur in most species (including humans), but may occur in Elasmobranchs.

For decades microbiologists searched for a mechanism that could explain the large diversity of antibody structure. For this reason the germ line theory emerged. According to this theory, the genomes contributed by the germ cell, sperm and egg contained a large repertoire of immunoglobulin genes. It was clear that there should be a mechanism that help the antibody to have diversity and keep it constant. The germ line theory could not provide any explanation on this aspect.

References

Germ line cells
Lymphocytes
Obsolete immunology theories